The 1990 British National Track Championships were a series of track cycling competitions held from 27 July – 4 August 1990 at the Leicester Velodrome.

Medal summary

Men's Events

Women's Events

References

1990 in British sport
July 1990 sports events in the United Kingdom
August 1990 sports events in the United Kingdom